This article concerns the period 499 BC – 490 BC.

References

External links